Brunei competed in the 2014 Commonwealth Games in Glasgow, Scotland from 23 July – 3 August 2014. Brunei's team consists of one solitary cyclist.

Cycling

Brunei's sole athlete competed in three cycling events.

Road
Men

Track
Points Race

Scratch

References

Nations at the 2014 Commonwealth Games
Brunei at the Commonwealth Games
Comm